Peabody Bay is a large bay in northwestern Greenland. Administratively it is part of Avannaata municipality.

Geography
Peabody Bay is located on the eastern side of the Kane Basin off the western end of the Humboldt Glacier.
Cape Forbes and the Cass Fjord lie at the northern end of the roughly 80 km wide bay. The McGary Islands lie at the southern end of the bay and the Bonsall Islands lie between that end and Dallas Bay to the SW.

Elisha Kane —whose Arctic venture in search of the lost Franklin expedition crossed the area in 1854— had named the Kane Basin itself "Peabody Bay," in honor of philanthropist George Peabody, the major funder of Kane's expedition. Currently, however, Peabody Bay is this smaller bay at the eastern side of the basin.

See also
Second Grinnell Expedition

References

External links 
Explanatory notes to the Geological map of Greenland
Bays of Greenland